Just Add Water may refer to:

In music:
 Just Add Water (Suga Free album), 2006
 Just Add Water (Virgil Donati album), 1997
 Just Add Water, an album by Bobby Previte, 2002
 Leaving the End Open (working title: Just Add Water), an album by Hardline, 2009 
 Just Add Water, a single by Dave Dobbyn, 2000.
 Just Add Water, a single by Cavetown, 2018

In other uses:
 Just Add Water (company), a video game developer based in England
 Just Add Water (film), a 2008 comedy
 Just Add Water (improv troupe), a Yale University student organization
 JAW: A Playwrights Festival, previously Just Add Water/West, an annual event produced by Portland Center Stage

See also 
 H2O: Just Add Water, an Australian children's TV series